"I'm Outstanding" is the second single released from former professional basketball player Shaquille O'Neal's debut album, Shaq Diesel (1993). Produced by Erick Sermon, the single was a minor success, making it to 47 on the Billboard Hot 100.

Samples 
"I'm Outstanding" sampled the following songs:
"Don't Stop the Music" by Yarbrough & Peoples
"The Payback" by James Brown
"Outstanding" by The Gap Band
"Jingling Baby" by LL Cool J

Single track listing

A-side
"I'm Outstanding" (LP version) – 4:07
"I'm Outstanding" (Funk Lord remix) – 3:55

B-side
"I'm Outstanding" (808 instrumental) – 4:04
"I'm Outstanding" (Funk Lord remix instrumental) – 3:56
"Ode to Shaquille" – 2:07

Charts

References

1993 singles
1993 songs
Shaquille O'Neal songs
Jive Records singles
Song recordings produced by Erick Sermon
Songs written by Erick Sermon
Songs written by Shaquille O'Neal